Kofa High School is a high school in Yuma, Arizona. It is a part of the Yuma Union High School District.

It was the second high school to be established in the community. The school shares its name with the Kofa Mountains, which were named for the King of Arizona gold mine, discovered in King Valley in 1896 and active from 1897 to 1910. The mine used to stamp its property "K of A", and is commonly known as the Kofa Mine. The school draws its mascot, the King, from the mine as well.

The school opened in 1959, designed by the Phoenix architecture firm of Edward L. Varney Associates. It was built by D. O. Norton and Son Construction Co. also of Phoenix. Major renovations were completed on the ageing campus in 2019 designed by DLR Group Architects.

Notable alumni, attendants, and faculty

Cain Velasquez, two-time Arizona State Wrestling Champion; professional mixed martial artist; former UFC Heavyweight champion
Roger L. Worsley, later a college president and administrator in Texas and Arkansas, taught at Kofa 1959-1962
Regina Romero, Mayor of Tucson, AZ, 2019–present.
Terri Kettunen Muschott, Miss Arizona 1986

References

External links
Kofa High School Website
Yuma Union High School District Website

Public high schools in Arizona
Schools in Yuma County, Arizona
[[Category:Buildings and structures in Yuma, Arizona]
All sports suck